The Villarreal Offensive was an offensive of the Spanish Civil War which lasted from 30 November to 24 December 1936. Eusko Gudarostea's 4,300 men fought 600 men of the insurgent forces.

Background
In 1936, the Basque Aguirre's government organized its own independent army, the Eusko Gudarostea, with 25,000 men. Nominally, the Basque Army was a part of the Republican Army of the North. Furthermore, the war industries were militarized and started the construction of the Bilbao's Iron Belt. In early December the Basques, launched an offensive in order to occupy Vitoria, the capital city of the Alava province, and reduce the Nationalist pressure on Madrid.

The battle
The Republicans, led by the General Francisco Llano de la Encomienda, assembled nineteen infantry battalions, six batteries and some armoured vehicles. The morale of the Basque troops was high, but they had virtually no air support and only a few field guns. Furthermore, before the offensive, one nationalist reconnaissance aircraft from Burgos, spotted the Republican force. Opposing them, the Nationalists had one company of Requetes, two infantry battalions, one machine-gun section and an artillery battery in Villarreal.

The offensive started on 30 November, and the Basques occupy the mountains around Vitoria, surrounded Villarreal (3 km from Vitoria) and their artillery bombed it, but they could not occupy the town. The Nationalist troops rejected the attacks of the Republican troops and the Basques suffered high losses (1,000 dead). Furthermore, Nationalist reinforces led by the Colonel Camilo Alonso Vega, reached the town. On 13 and 18 December, the Basques launched new attacks against the town, but both of them were rejected by the Nationalist troops. On 18 December, the Nationalists, started a counter-offensive and ended the siege of the town. By the 24 December the battle ended.

Aftermath
The offensive failed and the Basques did not occupy Villareal, although the Basque forces occupied the mountains of Maroto, Albertia and Jarinto, until the start of the Biscay Campaign.

See also 

 List of Spanish Nationalist military equipment of the Spanish Civil War
 List of Spanish Republican military equipment of the Spanish Civil War

Notes

References
Beevor, Antony. The Battle for Spain. The Spanish Civil War, 1936–1939. Penguin Books. 2006. London. .

Battles of the Spanish Civil War
1936 in Spain
Conflicts in 1936
Álava
November 1936 events
December 1936 events